Lindsay Hudson Head MBE (born 16 September 1935 in North Adelaide, South Australia) is a former Australian rules footballer who played with West Torrens in the South Australian National Football League (SANFL). He was awarded three Magarey Medals during his career.

SANFL 
Lindsay Head's first experience of state representation came in 1947, when he played in a state schoolboys carnival at the age of eleven. In 1953, he lined up in the senior South Australian state team to play Victoria. By the time he was nineteen, he had won the first of his three Magarey Medals in only his fourth league season, with the others being in 1958 and 1963.

Head played at SANFL level for nineteen seasons with West Torrens. His list of achievements for his club was notable: he played the most games for the club (327), won the club best and fairest award eight times, was club leading goalkicker twice, was captain-coach from 1959–1960 and captain in 1961, coached the club in 1981, and was also club president for five years. In his final season, in 1970, Head played his 320th career game to break Jack "Dinny" Reedman's long-standing South Australian elite football games record.

At state level, he represented South Australia on 37 occasions. He captained the state side in 1960, and was named an All-Australian at the 1956 Perth Carnival.

The Australian Football Hall of Fame's description refers to his "magnificent skills on both sides of his body," which is unfortunate as Head never learned to kick with his left foot. Instead he developed a check-side punt for passing and goal-shooting which was very accurate.

Head played in a premiership side in only his second ever season, but thereafter his side made the finals barely a handful of times in his remaining 17 seasons. His loyalty to his Eagles was therefore remarkable, particularly given that he was pursued not only by other SANFL clubs, but also by the wealthier Victorian Football League competition, notably receiving a big offer from the struggling South Melbourne in 1955.

Other 
Head played cricket for South Australia as a right-hand opening batsman (1957/58–1958/59). In nine matches he scored 425 runs at an average of 28.33.

He was appointed a Member of the Order of the British Empire (MBE) in the 1964 New Year Honours.

Lindsay Head is a Life Governor of the Woodville-West Torrens Eagles (which is the highest acknowledgement of the modern day Eagles).

References

External links 
 
 SANFL Hall of Fame
 Lindsay Head's MBE record on It's an Honour
 

1935 births
Living people
Australian Football Hall of Fame inductees
West Torrens Football Club players
West Torrens Football Club coaches
All-Australians (1953–1988)
Magarey Medal winners
South Australia cricketers
Australian rules footballers from Adelaide
South Australian Football Hall of Fame inductees
Australian Members of the Order of the British Empire